Hytönen is a Finnish surname. Notable people with the surname include:

 Aarne Hytönen (1901-1972), Finnish architect
 Erkki Hytönen (born 1933), Finnish ice hockey player
 Juha-Pekka Hytönen (born 1981), Finnish ice hockey forward  

Finnish-language surnames